The 2012–13 Highland Football League (known as the Press & Journal Highland League for sponsorship reasons) was the 110th season of the Highland Football League. The season began on 4 August 2012 and ended on 25 May 2013. Forres Mechanics were the defending champions.

The league was won by Cove Rangers, their fourth Highland League title.

Teams

League table

Results

References

Highland Football League seasons
5
Scottish